Abul Khair Chowdhury was a Jatiya Party politician and the former Member of Parliament of Madaripur-1.

Career
Chowdhury was elected to parliament from Madaripur-1 as a Jatiya Party candidate in 1986 and 1988.

References

Awami League politicians
Living people
3rd Jatiya Sangsad members
4th Jatiya Sangsad members
6th Jatiya Sangsad members
Year of birth missing (living people)